A Theka (IAST: Ṭhekā) literally means "support, prop". The term also refers to a musical composition in classical Indian music for percussion instruments that establish a rhythm (Chanda), beats (Matras) and the metric cycle of beats (Tala) in a performance.

A theka is the basic rhythmic phrase of a particular tala. It is the underlying repeated pattern that shapes the time cycle of a musical expression. Theka is a term used by the drummers such as the tabla players.

See also
Raga

References

Bibliography

 

 
Indian classical music
Hindustani music terminology
Carnatic music terminology